The Jebal Aulia Dam is a dam on the White Nile near Khartoum, Sudan. Its construction began 1933 and was completed in 1937. When completed it was the largest dam in the World.

The dam was built by Gibson and Pauling (Foreign) Ltd, which was a partnership between the British civil engineering company Pauling & Co. and the civil engineer John Watson Gibson.

In 2003 a hydroelectricity project with a  maximum capacity was completed on the dam. This increased the structure's strategic value, so it is now continually guarded by the Sudanese Army.

References

Dams completed in 1937
Dams in Sudan
Dams on the Nile
Energy infrastructure completed in 2003
Hydroelectric power stations in Sudan
Khartoum (state)
White Nile (state)